Walter Hoover (December 30, 1934 – April 16, 2020) was an American rower. He competed in the men's double sculls event at the 1952 Summer Olympics.

References

External links
 

1934 births
2020 deaths
American male rowers
Olympic rowers of the United States
Rowers at the 1952 Summer Olympics
People from Inyo County, California
Pan American Games medalists in rowing
Pan American Games gold medalists for the United States
Rowers at the 1955 Pan American Games